Welapahala Grama Niladhari Division is a Grama Niladhari Division of the Medadumbara Divisional Secretariat of Kandy District of Central Province, Sri Lanka. It has Grama Niladhari Division Code 822.

Welapahala is a surrounded by the Hilpenkandura, Bogahalanda, Hakuruthale, Meda Gammedda, Udagammedda and Thennalanda Grama Niladhari Divisions.

Demographics

Ethnicity 
The Welapahala Grama Niladhari Division has a Sinhalese majority (100.0%). In comparison, the Medadumbara Divisional Secretariat (which contains the Welapahala Grama Niladhari Division) has a Sinhalese majority (75.1%) and a significant Indian Tamil population (10.6%)

Religion 
The Welapahala Grama Niladhari Division has a Buddhist majority (100.0%). In comparison, the Medadumbara Divisional Secretariat (which contains the Welapahala Grama Niladhari Division) has a Buddhist majority (74.8%) and a significant Hindu population (16.2%)

References 

Grama Niladhari Divisions of Medadumbara Divisional Secretariat
Geography of Kandy District